= Alexander's Choice =

Novel

- Author: Edmund Marlowe
- Language: English
- Genre: Fiction
- Publication date: 2012
- Pages: 421

Alexander's Choice is a coming of age novel by Edmund Marlowe. It was published in 2012.
